Jacqueline Stanley, HRHA, ARCA (17 September 1928 – 12 December 2022) was a British and Irish painter and printmaker.

Biography
Stanley was born in Camberwell, London on 17 September 1928.

Stanley studied at Beckenham College of Art and the Royal College of Art, London (1949–1952).
Her fellow RCA students included Edward Middleditch, Jack Smith, John Bratby and Sheila Robinson.
She was tutored by John Minton, Ruskin Spear, Carel Weight and Francis Bacon who gave her, her first glass of Champagne.

In 1975, she moved to Ireland and taught at the National College of Art and Design in Dublin to 1990.

Stanley was married to Campbell Bruce (1927–2014). Both Bruce and Stanley were well known artists in Ireland in the 1970s and 1980s. Stanley was also an art teacher and taught Ian Dury.

Stanley exhibited widely and much of her work is in major public and private collections.

Stanley died in Cooden, Sussex on 12 December 2022, at the age of 94.

Awards and honours 
 1950 Royal College of Art Sketch club Award 1st prize in painting
 1950 Young Contemporaries 1st prize (shared with Donald Hamilton Fraser)
 1968 1st Prize for Painting Lord Mayor’s Art Award
 1972 Lord Mayor’s Exhibition, Guildhall, London Print Award
 1975 Showed at the Royal Academy Summer Exhibition, London
 1982 Founder member of Black Church Print Studio, Dublin.
 1987 Taiwan International Print (Jury Award)
 2018 Awarded Honorary Royal Hibernian Academician

External links 
 Website

References 

1928 births
2022 deaths
Irish women painters
Alumni of the Royal College of Art
People from Camberwell
Painters from London
20th-century British painters
20th-century Irish painters
21st-century British painters
21st-century Irish painters
Academics of the National College of Art and Design